"Stoner Sloth" was an anti-cannabis public service announcement series of three videos, created by Australia's New South Wales Department of Premier and Cabinet in 2015.

Content
Each ad begins with a scenario involving people in public places. As everyone is acting "normal", it is all disrupted by Stoner Sloth, a sloth who reacts slowly while moaning. Stoner Sloth is meant to represent the behavior of a stereotypical stoner and its actions are accompanied by a musical cue of a guitar being weakly strummed. The human characters around Stoner Sloth usually react with disgust or disappointment.

Reception
The creative firm Saatchi & Saatchi created the ads which "backfired miserably" and were an "instant and classic fail", according to trade publication Adweek. The agency defended its ads, which cost $500,000. The National Cannabis Prevention and Information Centre distanced itself from the campaign.

See also
 Substance abuse prevention

References

External links

 

2010s television commercials
2015 in Australian television
2015 in cannabis
2015 introductions
Anti-cannabis public service announcements
Australian advertising slogans
Cannabis in Australia
Fictional sloths and anteaters